Elizabeth Stanton may refer to:

 Elizabeth Stanton (television host) (born 1995), American television host
 Elizabeth Cady Stanton (1815–1902), American social activist and abolitionist
 Elizabeth Cady Stanton Blake (1894–1981), American painter
 Elizabeth Stanton (Massachusetts politician), a member of the Great and General Court of Massachusetts